3-Aminobenzamide is a benzamide. It is an off-white powder and has the chemical formula C7H8N2O.

Preparation
3-Aminobenzamide can be prepared through the reduction of 3-nitrobenzamide by catalytic hydrogenation.

Uses
3-Aminobenzamide is an inhibitor of poly ADP ribose polymerase  (PARP), an enzyme responsible for DNA repair, transcription control, and programmed cell death. When PARP is activated it rapidly uses up stores of nicotinamide adenine dinucleotide (NAD) in the cell as it performs DNA repair.  Low levels of NAD deplete the amount of ATP found in the cell which can lead to cell death.  The structure of 3-aminobenzamide is similar to that of NAD so it binds to PARP and prevents it from using up NAD.  PARP is often a target of cancer therapy and so 3-aminobenzamide could potentially be used as an anticancer drug.

References

Benzamides
Amines